Jikharra (إجخرة Ijkharrah) is a desert oasis town formerly in the Al Wahat District, Cyrenaica region, in north-eastern Libya. Prior to 2007, it was in the Ajdabiya District. After 2015 it was in Jikharra District (بلدية إجخرة).

References

External links
Satellite map at Maplandia.com
 http://www.wintershall.com/en/worldwide/libya.html

Oases of Libya
Populated places in Al Wahat District
Cyrenaica
Baladiyat of Libya